Diaranké Fofana (born 14 July 1989) is a French professional footballer who plays as a defender for Championnat National 2 club C'Chartres.

Career 
Fofana began his early career with the reserves of Creteil, and had a brief stint in Romania before returning to amateur league in France. In 2018, he joined Chambly and helped them get promoted to Ligue 2. He made his professional debut with Chambly in a 2–0 Coupe de la Ligue loss to Gazélec Ajaccio on 13 August 2019.

In August 2020 he moved to Championnat National side Cholet at the end of his Chambly contract.

On 6 June 2021, Fofana agreed to join Sedan. On 22 July 2022, he moved to C'Chartres.

Personal life
Born in France, Fofana is of Malian descent.

References

External links
 
 
 

1989 births
Living people
Sportspeople from Saint-Denis, Seine-Saint-Denis
French footballers
Association football defenders
FC Chambly Oise players
FC Universitatea Cluj players
USC Corte players
SO Cholet players
CS Sedan Ardennes players
C'Chartres Football players
Ligue 2 players
Championnat National players
Championnat National 2 players
Championnat National 3 players
Footballers from Seine-Saint-Denis
French sportspeople of Malian descent
Black French sportspeople